O39 may refer to:
 Ravendale Airport FAA LID, an airport in California
 O-39, one of the designations of the Curtiss Falcon aircraft
 OCBC Bank, based on its stock-trading code